Christian (Chris) Zwarg is a German mastering engineer, born September 12th, 1968 in Salzgitter (Niedersachsen, West Germany), brother of Alphazone member Alex Zwarg.

Career
Christian Zwarg is an engineer at Truesound Transfers in Berlin-Reinickendorf, Germany, as well as the owner of the company. He specializes in audio restoration.

Awards and nominations
Zwarg has received four Grammy nominations for Best Historical Album throughout his career. At the 61st Annual Grammy Awards in 2019, he is nominated twice in the same category. He is nominated for mastering At the Louisiana Hayride Tonight... and Battleground Korea: Songs and Sounds of America's Forgotten War.

References

External links
Production Credits

1968 births
Mastering engineers
German audio engineers
Engineers from Berlin
People from Salzgitter
Living people